Thomas Madigage (11 November 1970 – 19 October 2012) was a South African football player and coach.

Club career
Born in Pretoria, Madigage started his career at Arcadia Shepherds where he played alongside Paul Matthews, the son of Roy Matthews, assistant at Jomo Cosmos. After impressing Matthews, he was spotted by Jomo Sono who brought the player to his own team, raising him as a son.

He made his debut for Jomo Cosmos at the age of 16, winning the 1987 National Soccer League in his first year at the club. In 1990, he had a trial at Rangers with fellow Cosmos player Augustine Makalakalane, but the duo was not signed. Instead, both joined Swiss side FC Zürich.

At Zürich, Madigage suffered with knee injuries and played a single league match in a 5-1 loss against FC Luzern, scoring his sole team goal. After failing to appear in further matches, he returned to Jomo Cosmos in 1992.

He later joined Pretoria City (later renamed SuperSport United), winning the 2nd division and reaching the Bob Save Super Bowl in 1995, before retiring in 2003.

International career
Madigage earned four caps for the South African national team.

Retirement
After retiring as a player, Madigage worked as an assistant coach for SuperSport United from 2004 to 2012 and later the South African national team.

Later life and death
Madigage died in a car crash in the early hours of Friday 19 October 2012, after hitting a donkey crossing a road near Burgersfort, Limpopo. He was 41 at the time.

References

1970 births
2012 deaths
South African soccer players
FC Zürich players
Swiss Super League players
South Africa international soccer players
SuperSport United F.C. players
South African expatriate soccer players
Jomo Cosmos F.C. players
Arcadia Shepherds F.C. players
Expatriate footballers in Switzerland
South African soccer managers
Soccer players from Pretoria
Road incident deaths in South Africa
South African expatriate sportspeople in Switzerland
Association football midfielders